A hypertrophic scar is a cutaneous condition characterized by deposits of excessive amounts of collagen which gives rise to a raised scar, but not to the degree observed with keloids. Like keloids, they form most often at the sites of pimples, body piercings, cuts and burns. They often contain nerves and blood vessels. They generally develop after thermal or traumatic injury that involves the deep layers of the dermis and express high levels of TGF-β.

Cause
Mechanical tension on a wound has been identified as a leading cause for hypertrophic scar formation.

When a normal wound heals, the body produces new collagen fibers at a rate which balances the breakdown of old collagen. Hypertrophic scars are red and thick and may be itchy or painful. They do not extend beyond the boundary of the original wound, but may continue to thicken for up to six months. Hypertrophic scars usually improve over one or two years, but may cause distress due to their appearance or the intensity of the itching; they can also restrict movement if they are located close to a joint.

Some people have an inherited tendency to hypertrophic scarring, for example, those with Ehlers–Danlos syndrome.

Prevention 
It is not possible to completely prevent hypertrophic scars, so those with a history of them should inform their doctor or surgeon if they need surgery.

Management
A 2021 systematic review brought together evidence from different studies that investigated using silicone gel sheeting to treat hypertrophic scars. Thirteen studies with a total of 468 participants were reviewed in total. Many different treatments were included but it was uncertain whether silicone gel sheets were more effective than most of these. Silicone gel sheets may improve the appearance of scars slightly compared with applying onion extract, and may reduce pain compared with no treatment with silicone gel sheets or pressure garments.

A 2022 systematic review included multiple studies on laser therapy for treating hypertrophic scars. There was not enough evidence for the review authors to determine if laser therapy was more effective than other treatments. They were also unable to conclude if laser therapy leads to more harm than benefits compared with no treatment or different kinds of treatment.

Scar therapies, such as cryosurgery, may speed up the healing process from a hypertrophic scar to a flatter, paler one.

Early hypertrophic scars should be treated with applied pressure and massage in the first 1.5–3 months. If necessary, silicone therapy should be applied later. Ongoing hypertrophy may be treated with corticosteroids injections. Surgical revision may be considered after 1 year.

See also 
 Keloid
 List of cutaneous conditions

References 

Dermal and subcutaneous growths
Scarring